SimScale is a computer-aided engineering (CAE) software product based on cloud computing. SimScale was developed by SimScale GmbH and allows computational fluid dynamics, finite element analysis and thermal simulations. The backend of the platform uses open source codes:
 FEA: Code_Aster and CalculiX
 CFD: OpenFOAM
The cloud-based platform of SimScale allows users to run more simulations, and in turn iterate more design changes, compared to traditional local computer-based systems.

History 
SimScale was launched in 2013.

Features 

The thermal module allows uncoupled thermo-mechanical, conjugate heat transfer and convective heat transfer simulations.

Industrial applications 
Japan-based Tokyowheel — a company that engineers technical carbon fiber racing wheels for competitive cyclists — used SimScale's CFD software component to determine the most aerodynamic wheel profile. QRC Technologies performed thermal simulations on SimScale to test multiple variations of their RF tester.

Marketing 

On 2 December 2015, a community plan was announced making the platform accessible free of charge, based on a new investment round led by Union Square Ventures. It includes a one-time allotment of 3000 computation hours and 500 GB of storage for any registered user. Simulations and projects created by a user registered under the plan are accessible to all other users within the public project library.

SimScale has also organized several free webinars:
 3D Printer Workshop
 F1 Aerodynamics Workshop
 Simulation in Biomedical Engineering Workshop

References 

Cloud platforms
Computer-aided engineering software for Linux
Finite element software
Simulation software